Charles Fuller (1939–2022) was an American playwright and writer.

Charles Fuller may also refer to:

Charles Fuller (footballer) (1919–2004), English footballer
Charles E. Fuller (Baptist minister) (1887–1968), American Christian clergyman and radio evangelist
Charles E. Fuller (New York politician) (1847–1925), New York farmer and politician
Charles Eugene Fuller (1849–1926), U.S. Representative from Illinois
Charles H. Fuller (1859–1938), American politician

See also
William Charles Fuller (1884–1974), Welsh recipient of the Victoria Cross
Charles Fuller Baker (1872–1927), American entomologist, botanist, agronomist and collector